Olga Schuchkina (born 30 October 1980) is a Russian cross-country skier who competed between 2002 and 2014. She finished 38th in the 30 km event at the 2010 Winter Olympics in Vancouver.

Her best World Cup finish was third in a 15 km mixed pursuit event at Russia in January 2010.

Cross-country skiing results
All results are sourced from the International Ski Federation (FIS).

Olympic Games

World Cup

Season standings

Individual podiums
1 podium

References

External links

1980 births
Cross-country skiers at the 2010 Winter Olympics
Living people
Olympic cross-country skiers of Russia
People from Syktyvkar
Russian female cross-country skiers
Sportspeople from the Komi Republic